Michael Hughes  was a Welsh Anglican priest in the 17th century.

Hughes was educated at Brasenose College, Oxford. He held livings at [[ Usk, co, Monmouth, 1633, sinecure rector of Llandyssil, co. Montgomery, and vicar of Chirk, and Llandudno. He was appointed archdeacon of Merioneth in 1676, a post he held until his death in 1680.

References

Alumni of Brasenose College, Oxford
Archdeacons of Merioneth
17th-century Welsh Anglican priests
1680 deaths